The state treasurer of New Mexico is an elected constitutional officer in the executive branch of the U.S. state of New Mexico. Thirty individuals have held the office of state treasurer since statehood. The incumbent is Laura Montoya, a Democrat who took office on January 1, 2023, after being elected on November 8, 2022.

Eligibility and term of office
No person may be elected state treasurer other than a United States citizen of at least 30 years of age who has resided continuously in New Mexico for five years preceding the election. The state treasurer is elected to a four-year term and is able to serve up to two consecutive terms; more terms may be served after one full term has intervened.

Powers and duties
In New Mexico, the state treasurer serves as the chief banker and investment officer of the state. As such, the state treasurer provides cash management to state agencies, invests the state agency and local government investment pools, and administers New Mexico's ABLE and retirement savings programs. The state treasurer also chairs the State Treasurer's Investment Committee and is an ex officio voting member of the Capitol Buildings Planning Commission, the Educational Retirement Board, the New Mexico Educational Assistance Foundation, the New Mexico Martin Luther King, Jr. Commission, the New Mexico Mortgage Finance Authority, the New Mexico Retiree Health Care Authority, the New Mexico Small Business Investment Corporation, the Public Employees Retirement Association, the Renewable Energy Transmission Authority, the State Board of Finance, and the State Investment Council. These bodies manage public pensions, invest New Mexico's permanent funds, issue state debt, provide financing for various economic development programs, and supervise the state's financial affairs, among many other responsibilities.

History of corruption
The Office of the State Treasurer has been the subject of multiple corruption charges in recent decades. In 1975 Treasurer Jesse D. Kornegay pleaded guilty to perjury charges and served time in federal prison. Again in 1985, Treasurer Earl Hartley pleaded guilty to malfeasance in office related to the diversion of funds from a treasurer's conference to his personal account. His deputy, Ken Johnson, was also arrested in December 1984 and pleaded guilty in 1985 to extortion. Hartley resigned from the office in 1985 and was succeeded by James B. Lewis, an appointee of Governor Toney Anaya.

Treasurer David King testified against one of his office's division managers, Joseph O. Garcia, who was charged with bribery of a public official after offering King a bribe for investment activities. Later in 2005, Treasurer Michael A. Montoya pleaded guilty to federal charge of extortion, and in 2007 he also pleaded guilty to a state charge of racketeering. A Democrat, he served four years in prison. Most recently in 2006, Treasurer Robert E. Vigil was convicted of one count of attempted extortion and was acquitted of 23 counts of extortion and racketeering with regard to the investment of state funds. He served time in Federal prison. Robert E. Vigil was a protege of Michael A. Montoya.  Robert Vigil resigned in December 2005 and was succeeded by Doug Brown, who was appointed by Governor Bill Richardson.

List of State Treasurers

Notes

References

External links
 State Treasurer of New Mexico